Jacquelin Perry, M.D. (May 31, 1918 – March 11, 2013) was an American physician. Perry made major contributions to the fields of post-polio syndrome and gait analysis.  A building named after her stands at Rancho Los Amigos National Rehabilitation Center.

References

1918 births
2013 deaths
American rehabilitation physicians
American women physicians
21st-century American women